Perry Township is a township in Mercer County, Pennsylvania, United States. The population was 1,332 at the 2020 census, down from 1,453 in  2010.

Geography
According to the United States Census Bureau, the township has a total area of 18.0 square miles (46.7 km2), of which 18.0 square miles (46.7 km2)  is land and 0.06% is water.

Demographics
As of the census of 2000, there were 1,471 people, 581 households, and 435 families residing in the township.  The population density was 81.6 people per square mile (31.5/km2).  There were 627 housing units at an average density of 34.8/sq mi (13.4/km2).  The racial makeup of the township was 99.12% White, 0.07% African American, 0.07% Native American, 0.07% Asian, 0.07% from other races, and 0.61% from two or more races. Hispanic or Latino of any race were 0.14% of the population.

There were 581 households, out of which 30.1% had children under the age of 18 living with them, 66.3% were married couples living together, 5.7% had a female householder with no husband present, and 25.1% were non-families. 22.2% of all households were made up of individuals, and 10.0% had someone living alone who was 65 years of age or older.  The average household size was 2.53 and the average family size was 2.96.

In the township the population was spread out, with 24.1% under the age of 18, 5.8% from 18 to 24, 28.6% from 25 to 44, 26.2% from 45 to 64, and 15.2% who were 65 years of age or older.  The median age was 40 years. For every 100 females there were 101.0 males.  For every 100 females age 18 and over, there were 100.2 males.

The median income for a household in the township was $35,221, and the median income for a family was $40,192. Males had a median income of $30,843 versus $25,268 for females. The per capita income for the township was $16,482.  About 5.0% of families and 7.9% of the population were below the poverty line, including 14.2% of those under age 18 and 3.8% of those age 65 or over.

References

Townships in Mercer County, Pennsylvania